The Norman Rockwell Code is a 2006 parody of the widely popular movie, The Da Vinci Code.  The plot is ridiculously exaggerated in an attempt to mock the Da Vinci Code. The movie was listed on the June 2, 2006 issue of Entertainment Weekly's "The Must List."

Plot 
The plot centers around the murder of the curator of the Norman Rockwell Museum in Stockbridge, Massachusetts. The police call in Professor Langford Fife (a pastiche of both Robert Langdon from the book and Barney Fife from The Andy Griffith Show), a professor of symbology at a local community college, to help them solve the mystery. As the curator was dying, he put on a pair of rubber overalls. He held a lemon in one hand and a can of Chicken of the Sea in the other. He called the police as he was dying and told them that Mr. Fife could decode the message.

Mr. Fife meets Sopha Poisson during the course of his investigation. She informs him that the murdered curator was her grandfather. Together they work to decode a series of messages hidden in the paintings of Norman Rockwell, leading to a shocking discovery: Sopha is a mermaid. The movie ends with Mr. Fife taking her to the sea.

Cast 
Mike Walsh as Langford
Danica Carlson as Sopha
Fritz Wetherbee as the Curator
Gregory G. Athans as the Gatekeeper
Ralph Napolitano as Skipper
Alfred Thomas Catalfo as the Detective
Tom Seiler as the Police Captain
Christopher Roblee as the Actor

References

External links 
The Norman Rockwell Code at the Internet Movie Database

2006 films
American mystery films
2000s parody films
Norman Rockwell
American parody films
Films about mermaids
2006 comedy films
2000s English-language films
2000s American films